Duguay-Trouin was a  74-gun ship of the line of the French Navy.

Career 
In 1791, Duguay-Trouin  ferried troops from Brest to Martinique and Saint Domingue, along with Amphitrite, Danaé, Éole, Apollon, Didon and Jupiter. The next year, she patrolled off Bretagne.

In 1793, Duguay-Trouin took part in the operations in Sardinia, and ran aground off Cagliari on 12 February, although she managed to break free on 19.

Present at Toulon when the city was surrendered to the British by a rebellion of Royalists, she was scuttled by fire at the end of the Siege of Toulon. The wreck was raised in 1807 and broken up.

Notes, citations, and references
Notes

Citations

References

Ships of the line of the French Navy
Téméraire-class ships of the line
1788 ships